RSAI may refer to:

 Regional Science Association International
 Royal Society of Antiquaries of Ireland